Ulpiana was an ancient Roman city located in what is today Kosovo. It was also named Justiniana Secunda. Ulpiana is situated in the municipality of Lipjan.  The Minicipium Ulpiana - Iustiniana Secunda was proclaimed archaeological park under permanent protection of Kosovo by the Kosova Council for Cultural Heritage in 2016. The protection zone of the Archaeological Park has 96.23 ha and includes also Justinopolis, constructed during the reign of Justinian. Ulpiana was among the largest settlements in the Balkans of the late antiquity.

Naming 
During the 3rd and 4th centuries AD, Ulpiana reached a peak of development, leading to it being ascribed the epithet Splendissima ("Magnificent"). An earthquake in 518 destroyed the city, but emperor Justinian, who ascended to the throne in 527, ordered it to be rebuilt, renaming the city Justiniana Secunda, distinguishing it from Justiniana Prima, a city newly founded by Justinian in 535. In Greek, it is recorded as Ουλπιάνα.

Geography 

Ulpiana lies in fertile land, near the left bank of the river Gračanica, where nearby there is a mine which has been used since Roman times. This mine notably played a considerable role on the development of important cities in the Roman province of Dardania. Today one can find the ruins of the city around 9 km in south-east of Pristina and it includes the municipality of Laplje Selo. 

In the geo-physical research made by an Albanian archaeologist and others, it has been found that there are more than 100 hectares worth of objects within the territory of the ancient town. On the north side of the city is the cemetery, where several important establishments have been found, such as the foundations of a Basilica (Paleolithic-Christian) of early Christianity, built in the early 4th century by Emperor Justinian. Also found is the north entrance of the city, with its walls, a memorium and a room or a form of funeral. The ruins of a building with a beautiful mosaic are found in the south of the city. The research was mainly focused on the ancient objects which have been found on the sides of the main road, which connected the city with the region. The attention was given to the findings of the objects in the north entrance of the city. With the addition of the use of air photography and satellites in the past years archaeologists, with no costly digging, were able to find and describe many big antique buildings which included a public bathroom, the forum (administrative center of the city), a residency of the bishop in the era of the early Christianity, and a baptismal chapel.

History 

Ulpiana played an important role in the development of the most important cities in the Roman province of Dardania. Ulpiana  is mentioned in ancient sources from the second decade of the 2nd century AD. Since then it played an important role during the invasive expeditions when the emperor could stop during his travels. Ulpiana became an important center episcopal Episcopal joining Scupi city (modern Skopje, North Macedonia) until the establishment of Justiniana Prima.

Under "Notitia" (Not. Digna. Or. IX, 44) Ulpiana had a great garrison also in Pseudocomitatenses Ulpiansis. Evidence exists that Emperor Theodosius I during the transition to Thessaloniki stayed in Ulpiana (cod. THEOD I 33-34) for a period of time. In the 5th century, the city was under the rule of the Goths. In 479 King Theodemir sent his son Theoderic the Great with 3,000 soldiers to destroy the city.

According to the chronicle and writings of Marcellinus Comes, a devastating earthquake destroyed several towns in Dardania in the year 518. The city of Ulpiana suffered extensive damage. Emperor Justinian rebuilt the city and its fortifications. The ancient city's fortifications had been strong, with semi-circular shaped towers that reached up to 35.5 ha in area. Together with its surroundings, Ulpiana covered an area of approximately 120 hectares, when including Castrum and other supporting facilities.

Ulpiana was among the largest settlements in the Balkans of the late antiquity.

Archaeology
The first landfills in the ruins of the ancient city were made before 1990. Ulpiana archaeological research for the first time took place in 1953, with four graves were dug in the northern part of the cemetery. Investigations are concentrated in the northern settlement and cemetery, where different findings have been discovered: the foundations of a basilica (paleo-Christian) early Christianity, built at the beginning of the 6th century by the Emperor Justinian, the northern entrance of fortification (walls of the city) and Memoriumi, a small room or ambient funeral.

Since the start of excavation in Ulpiana, in this important Roman-Byzantine city there are very few written knowledge. Few writings have come from memorials manuscripts which street descriptors who have visited this area since the 19th century wrote.  Ulpiana city mostly was studied by Nikola Vulić, he had the opportunity to collect and distribute written stories from Kosovo and Ulpiana. These stories he presented at the beginning of the 20th century together with Anton von Premerstein. Later on this story Roman writers have added some new data again between the two world wars. N. Vuliċ also in some cases provided explanations for historical events Ulpiana. Full statement of historical events of the city on the basis of data from ancient times and in the epigraph monument was presented by B. Sarie in Realencyclopädie der classischen Altertumswissenschaft which Emil Čerškov directed to the data on new materials from landfill archaeological 1954−1959. Ulpiana was mentioned for the first time in the 2nd century BC about archaeological data (Rtol. III, 9.6), in the case of counting Dardania cities: Naissus, Skupi, Arribantion  and Ulpiana. From before the Roman period, the city's history has not given any information unless signs.  A Neolithic terracotta figurine was discovered in 2016 near the two towers of the northern gate of the city. Because of these signs we realize that Ulpiana in the 2nd century had municipal status and was the source of border stations (station Ulpianensis).

The remains of the building with beautiful mosaics are found in the southern part of the city, which have been excavated recently by municipal workers when placing pipes and water pipes across the zone that covers the ancient. In 1974, at the location of the field Čerkezi, not far from Ulpiana, a large mound was discovered that combustion residue contained a princess. Also discovered a rich treasure containing silver items, perfume bottles and everyday objects. Relying on knowledge of the traditions of burning body and associated objects discovered along with the princess (or rather the remains of it) it  can be said what the remains are dated it somewhere in the 3rd century BC.

Other research in this area took place between 1981 and 1987, these led from Belgrade Archaeological Institute in cooperation with the Institute for Protection of Monuments in Kosovo as well as the Institute for the Protection of Cultural Monuments and the Institute for the Protection and Presentation of Cultural Values in Prishtina. Mainly focused research in the excavations of ancient objects, which were discovered on both sides of the main road linking the ancient cities in the region.

In 1982, has discovered a prehistoric cemetery in the center of the ancient city, that the transition period between the bronze and iron period (13th–9th centuries BC). In 1993, the Institute for Protection of Cultural Monuments of Pristina, undertook conservation work in memorium and marble sarcophagus. In 1995, repairs to water pipes in the area in question led to the discovery of some of the foundations of a building. Determining the exact date of the establishment of Ulpiana is not easy. However, relying on archaeological finds excavated so far as prehistoric ceramics, tombs of the Bronze period Lower Bernice culture, as well as other findings early and late period of iron, we can say that Ulpianais established on a prehistoric dwelling somewhere in the 1st or 2nd century AD. Construction then continued more or less in the 6th century AD.

In 2012, archaeologists discovered a church which was constructed before the 5th century A.D.

Objects 
The object which have  been found in the ruins of the city are several but most important ones are: a woman's head, a man's head, the head of Eros and the tragic mask.

Woman's head 
The sculpture represents a portrait of middle aged woman made of white fine–grained marble, 18 cm high. In the psychological structure of this portrait, realism is the predominant means of representation of the inner life and a certioni stillness in the contrast soft modeling supports even more the impression of meditation, yearning, sensitivity and restraint. The details of the face with the small, lightly marked locks on the forehead, all shaped in a masterly manner, emphasize its individual characterizations. The whole treatment of the face points to a high quality work of art; its artist was an excellent sculptor who probably worked in some art centre where the tradition of the classical Greek sculpture inherited though the classicist sculpture of the late Hellenism and the art of Hadria's epoch, was still respected. In contrast to the finely modeled hair and small locks on the forehead and over the ears, the braids are done very simply: by vertical and slanting broken cuts. This head was found in the layer which E. Čerškov, according to the other archaeological material, judges that it dates from the middle of the 3rd to the beginning of the 4th century. Considering stylistic characteristics and analogy we can estimate more precisely that it dates from last quarter of the 4th century.

Man's head 
It is a marble head of a strong middle-aged man, which judging by its size (height 33 cm), was a part of a life–size statue. The portrait is realistically sculptured; it is characterized by simple modeling: the “realism” of hair and the beard is carved in such a way as obtained only with the play of lights and shadows and when looked at from a certain distance.  In the attempt to represent the psychological state, here, too, the greatest attention is paid to eyes’ and their expression and this effect is brought into prominence instead of a more detailed modeling of face features. It is made in the manner of the late Roman portrait art which culminated around the middle of the 3rd century when some of the greatest Roman portraits were created.

Head of Eros 
This marble head(height : 15.6 cm) a small, plump Eros with childish face and long, curly hair. According to the stylistic characteristics and analogies and historical contexts it can be the sculpture and circumstances of the finding it makes it impossible to a determine its precise purpose and meaning.

Tragic mask 
It is a powerful male face modeled in a very realistic way with explicit characteristics of Roman theatrical mask and without almost and distinctive work features. It is made in grey marble (height 27.5 cm) and is a remarkable work, probably an import from some better known art centre. It was found on the site of the North Necropolis. Its features and details on the face are made extremely plastically and grotesquely. were probably inserted in the big eye-sockets, as was the case with some marble heads representing theatrical masks. Observing it as a whole and examining some typical details, experts are inclined to think that the models looked for in the tradition of the Roman theatre in the 1st century AD goes on the territory of Yugoslavia, is reflected in its stylistic and artistic characteristics as well as in the fact that it is one of a few theatrical masks made as a full monumental stone sculpture. It is one of the finest sculptures ever found in Ulpiana and it probably dates from the 2nd century.

Necropolis 
The researches about tombstones in Ulpiana started at 1953. The researcher that began the research was Nikolić. He found four graves in the northern Necropolis. After him between 1954 and 1959 two other researchers made some systematical researches. Their names were Emil Čerškov and Ljubiśa Popović. These researches were a great success and answer in so many questions about this ancient city. In the first year of the excavations they found out a memorial in that buildings here were a lot of sargofags with different construction. One of the sarcofagi were made of merćmer was in the centre of that place on the floor made by mermer plates. The space was named “memoria” where there were found 3 big graves which made of brick and one smaller with a plate during the works they found 2 tombstones decorated with cravings and on one of them there was an inscription in honor of Elia Clementila. In another grave there was a tombstone with the whole family craved. There was found another monument which is important for ulpiana because of inscription on it dedicated to Mark Ponti Varan and it gave the archaeologist the date not just about Mark Ponti but about the arrangement of the town. The interesting thing that they found in this tombstone was that this one was bigger than the others and belonged to a whole family.

Gallery

See also 

 Archaeology of Kosovo
 List of settlements in Illyria

Notes

Bibliography

References

External links 
 Pictures of Ulpiana
 Turkish archaeologists reveal 6th century baptistery abroad
 History of goddess in front

Illyrian Kosovo
Illyricum (Roman province)
Dardanians
Moesia
Moesia Superior
Dardania (Roman province)
Archaeology of Illyria
Archaeological Sites of Exceptional Importance
Archaeology of Kosovo
Roman towns and cities in Kosovo
Archaeological sites in Kosovo
Cities in ancient Illyria